The Central Committee of the 27th Congress of the Communist Party of the Soviet Union was in session from 1986 until 1990. Its 1st Plenary Session elected the Politburo, the Secretariat and the Party Control Committee of the 27th Congress of the Communist Party of the Soviet Union.

History

Election and composition
The 27th Congress witnessed the greatest turnover of Central Committee members in the party's history since 22nd Party Congress (held in 1961) during Nikita Khrushchev's leadership. The numbers of full membership were reduced from 319 in the  26th Central Committee to 307, while candidate membership was increased from 151 to 170. Of the 307 full members elected to the 27th Central Committee, 102 (making up 33 percent of membership) were newcomers. 25 officials, who had previously served as candidate members in the 26th Central Committee, were promoted to full membership. In total 125 new full members were appointed, making up 41 percent. 182 members (59 percent) were reelected to the 27th Central Committee, a decrease from the 26th Congress, in which 238 (75 percent) were reelected. Of the 170 candidate members, 54 (32 percent) were reelected, while the other 116 were newcomers. The 1st Plenary Session elected Lev Zaykov (then First Secretary of the Leningrad City Party Committee) to full membership in the Politburo, while Nikolay Slyunkov (Communist Party of Byelorussia First Secretary) and Yuri Solovyev (First Secretary of the Leningrad Regional Party Committee) were given Politburo candidate membership. The plenum elected five newcomers to the Secretariat; Alexandra Biryukova (the first women to hold high party office since Yekaterina Furtseva in the Khrushchev era), Anatoly Dobrynin, Vadim Medvedev, Georgy Razumovsky and Alexander Yakovlev. The 1st Plenary Session reelected Mikhail Gorbachev to the office of the general secretary.

In a similar vein, Gorbachev managed to get close advisers elected to the Central Committee. Anatoly Chernyaev (Gorbachev's foreign adviser) and Anatoly Lukyanov, (head of the party's General Department) were promoted to full membership, while Valery Boldin was elected to the 27th Central Committee as a candidate member. Several figures within the Central Academy of Social Sciences, most notably Evgeny Velikhov, were appointed to the Central Committee as candidate members. Notably the 27th Congress did not reelect Richard Kosolapov, the longtime editor of the party's theoretical journal Kommunist, and was replaced by Ivan Frolov. Several Brezhnev appointed heads of Central Committee departments failed to be reelected to the Central Committee; Ivan Sakhnyuk (Agricultural-Machine Building Department), Kirill Simonov (Transport and Communications Department) and Vasily Shauro (Culture Department). Nikolay Savkin (Administrative Organs Department) and Vladimir Karlov (Agriculture and Food Industry Department) were the two last remaining Central Committee departments heads appointed by Brezhnev. Of the 23 department heads, fourteen were replaced by the 1st Plenary Session. Four leading officials from the Brezhnev era, who retired from the Politburo and the Secretariat at the 27th Congress, were reelected to the Central Committee; Nikolai Tikhonov (former Chairman of the Council of Ministers), Nikolai Baibakov (the former Chairman of the State Planning Committee), Boris Ponomarev (former Head of the International Department) and Vasili Kuznetsov (the former First Deputy Chairman of the Presidium of the Supreme Soviet).

Tenure

Combating party formalism; 1st–2nd Plenary Sessions
The newly elected leadership was united in supporting reforms, principally behind the slogan uskoreniye (literally "acceleration"), which called for improving the Soviet economy, and to combat formalism, corruption, nepotism and centralism within the party. Beginning in March 1985, the Central Committee (through the Soviet press) began criticizing the norms and organizational habits of the party; criticism increased by the discovery of corruption rings in the communist parties of Kazakhstan (CPK, Kirghizia (CPKi), Turkmenistan (CPT), Moldavia (CPM), Uzbekistan (CPU) and Azerbaijan (ACP). The policy of appointing officials on the basis of "personal loyalty, servility and protectionism" were blamed on the party's subpar performance in certain areas, and in areas in which this was not the case, the Central Committee focused on the lack of inner-party democracy. To strengthen party democracy, Gorbachev called for an increase in criticism and self-criticism (claiming it was as critical "for us as air") to overcome "'paradeness, ballyhoo . . . [and] the embellishment of reality". An article in Pravda noted that "In some places people try to 'prepare' the discussion in such a way as to avoid any tricky issues in it. Speeches are usually made only by 'staff' speakers, usually in a predetermined order. Things even go as far as the editing of draft texts of speeches." Meetings became ceremonial, and lacked effective power—which led local authorities to misinform the central authorities on the situation in the given area. All forms of "window-dressing", or hiding abuses of power in general, were to be stopped. In the current situation, Solovyev noted;
The main demand which the party makes under modern conditions on the party committee secretary and the staff officer is ensuring that nowhere, under no circumstances, does word part from deed since any discrepancy here causes palpable damage to the authority of our policy and cannot be tolerated in any form.
Boris Griaznov, the First Secretary of the Frunze District Party Committee, was signalled out as an official "'accustomed to stagnation, encouraged ostentation, ignored collective opinion, lost the feeling of party comradeship, and only pretended to be carrying out restructuring", while party leaders in Kazakhstan had difficulty of ridding"themselves of elements of excessive administration and a commander-like style [behaviour]". The central leadership continued to highlight the party work ethics of first secretaries at every level; at the 2nd Plenary Session Gorbachev condemned certain localities of not committing themselves to the new work-style. In other cases, as noted by Gorbachev, party leaders did not know how to react to criticism or how to introduce changes, noting that "Sometimes words are substituted for deeds, no action is taken in response to criticism, and self-criticism takes the form of self-flagellation." Historian Graeme Gill asserts; "complaints about the way in which the party was operating which resounded through the press in 1985 and 1986 amounted to a condemnation of the party's organisational culture. [...] During the first eighteen months or so of Gorbachev's tenure as General Secretary, there seems to have been a general underestimation of the strength and sources of this culture and of what was necessary to eradicate it. The heart of the solution the Gorbachev leadership pursued was thoroughly traditional in the Soviet context, personnel.

Collectivity of leadership, and collectivism in general, was hailed as "a reliable guarantee against the adoption of volitional, subjective decisions, manifestations of the cult of personality, and the infringement of Leninist norms of party life." In tandem, the Central Committee began calling for psychological restructuring of party members. However, since the 27th Congress failed to create institutions which oversaw the implementation of these measures (and others), individual members who had no interest in changing their work habits were not punished. The reason for the lack of oversight was Gorbachev's belief that the party was a "healthy organism", and as Graeme Gill concludes, "A healthy organism clearly did not need radical institutional surgery." When it became clear to Gorbachev that the reforms to "invigorate" the party had failed, the reform consensus within the leadership was split asunder. Gorbachev began moving in a more radical directions, while several prominent colleagues in the Politburo, Secretariat and the Central Committee opposed his new measures. The schism in the leadership led to the failure to convene the 3rd Plenary Session in the last half of 1986 (being postponed to January 1987). Nonetheless, before the 3rd Plenary Session, the Central Committee was able to remove Dinmukhamed Konayev, the CPK First Secretary. The removal of Konayev, who was widely perceived to support an out-dated work ethic and to be corrupt, led to the Jeltoqsan riots when it was discovered that Konayev would be replaced by Gennady Kolbin, an ethnic Russian who had never lived in the Kazakh Soviet Socialist Republic.

Democratization: 3rd–7th Plenary Sessions
On 23 December 1985, the Politburo appointed Boris Yeltsin, an official from Sverdlovsk, First Secretary of the Moscow City Committee (de facto mayor of Moscow). Gorbachev had endorsed the appointment, heeding the advice of Yegor Ligachev (the party's informal second-in-command) who personally recommended him. In contrast, Nikolai Ryzhkov told Gorbachev in private that "He [Yeltsin] will cause you only grief. I would not recommend him." Yeltsin, who had introduced himself as something of a centrist at the 27th Congress, proved himself to be a supporter of radical change, going even as far, as on 19 January 1986, of criticising Gorbachev personally for "exaggerat[ing] the changes that had occurred" during his leadership.

Gorbachev opened the 3rd Plenary Session by criticising the party's performance, claiming the party's failure to reform was due to "conservatism and inertia, lenience and lack of demandingness, toadyism and personal adulation, red tape, formalism, intolerance and suppression of criticism, ambition and careerism, administration by decree, permissiveness, mutual coverups, careerism, departmentalism, parochialism, nationalism, substitutionism, a weakening of the role of party meetings and elective bodies,embezzlement, bribery, report-padding and violation of discipline." The cure for this "disease" was "demokratizatsiya", literally the democratization of society. He called for open, democratic debates in the primary party organizations and to allow a secret ballot during plenary sessions of the district, area, city, region and territory party committees and the central committees of the republican parties to elect the executive organs. This was an attack on the nomenklatura, a system in which leading officials appointed the cadres at the level below, the basis of the Soviet system. The plenary session opposed his suggestions, and while his criticisms were mentioned in the Resolution of the 3rd Plenary Session, the idea of multi-candidate elections within the Party were omitted from the text.

In preparation of the 4th Plenary Session, Gorbachev had prepared a speech on Soviet and Party history. In it he condemned the rule of Joseph Stalin and Stalinism in general, but the speech was amended by Politburo. Conservatives such as Ligachev, Andrei Gromyko, Mikhail Solomentsev and Vitaly Vorotnikov did not share Gorbachev's views, or at least, did not support a public anti-Stalinist proclamation. Despite the conservative reaction, Gorbachev was able to rehabilitate Nikolay Bukharin and Nikita Khrushchev, while referring to Stalin's repressive regime as "immense and unpardonable".

The 4th Plenary Session was supposed to discuss economic reforms, but instead of focusing on the matter at hand Yeltsin, according to Gorbachev, attacked the speed of perestroika, the work of the Secretariat and Ligachev personally. From this point on, the relationship between Gorbachev and Yeltsin would only grow worse—however, by this time, the press mistakenly had begun to present Yeltsin as Gorbachev's closest reformist associate in the Politburo. In the summer of 1987, when Gorbachev was on vacation, Ligachev (on Gorbachev's bidding) led the party apparatus (and chaired the meetings of the Politburo). On 10 September he organized an Inquiry Commission of the Central Committee to investigate the performance of the Moscow City Committee under Yeltsin's stewardship—Yeltsin reacted to the inquiry by becoming the first Politburo member in history to willingly resign from his seat. In respsonse Gorbachev told Yeltsin they could discuss the situation after the 70th Anniversary of the October Revolution. At the 5th Plenary Session, which was devoted to the aforementioned anniversary, Yeltsin completely broke by protocol by denouncing Gorbachev and Ligachev personally, and resigned from the Politburo. The central leadership reacted in kind, by criticizing him at the plenary session; Yakovlev contended that he had been "reacting immaturely to 'petty offenses'", while Ryzhkov accused him of being driven by "ambition pure and simple". Soon after his resignation, Yeltsin was hospitalized, either for suffering a heart attack (as Yeltsin contends) or for "a fake suicide attempt with scissors" (as Gorbachev and the members of the central leadership contends). At a session of the Moscow City Committee on 11 November 1987, the party leadership dragged Yeltsin out of the hospital and forced him to attend the meeting in which he was relieved of his duties as First Secretary and unceremoniously humiliated. The meeting proved to be a mistake; the Soviet populace began sympathising with Yeltsin—a problem which was compounded "by the mistake" of Gorbachev attending the Moscow City Committee session. In the aftermath, Yeltsin was appointed First Deputy Chairman of the State Committee for Construction (chaired by Yuri Batalin), but was told on the day of his appointment by Gorbachev that he could not participate in politics.

At the 6th Plenary Session Ligachev delivered the first speech, the first time that Gorbachev had not done so himself. Ligachev attacked what he perceived as the excesses of glasnost, the influence of rock music in society, "the blackening of Soviet history" and the failure of the leadership to do anything with the growing nationalism in the republics. Gorbachev did not speak until the second day of the plenum, and gave a defensive speech in which he defended his reform efforts but called for the establishment of a "middle ground" in which balanced Soviet historiography and supported using Soviet patriotism to counter the rising nationalism in the republics. The plenary session relieved Yeltsin of his duties as candidate member of the Politburo and member of the Secretariat, and elected Razumovsky (Head of the Organisational-Party Work Department) and Yuri Maslyukov (Chairman of the State Planning Committee) to Politburo candidate membership. Leading conservative figures, such as General Dmitry Yazov, had begun criticising Gorbachev's democratising policies openly in December 1987, claiming they weakened the honour of the Soviet military, while party first secretaries in the republics called for a tightening of party control in reaction to the growing nationalism amongst the populace.

In between the 6th and the 7th plenary sessions, the Nina Andreyeva Affair took place. Andreyeva, "an hitherto unknown lecturer at a Leningrad chemical institute, wrote an article in Sovetskaya Rossiya titled "I Cannot Forsake My Principles". She condemned Gorbachev's reforms and called for their reversal. She criticized the Gorbachev leadership's habit of opening the previous black spots in Soviet history, which she claimed only helped to denigrate the Soviet past. In addition, the article is notable for its anti-semitism; of all the Jews mentioned, only Karl Marx was not accused of participating in blackening of Soviet history and destroying the Soviet order. The importance of the article does not lay in its author, but rather how it was interpreted by the forces in the Central Committee — both conservatives, centrists and reformers fought Nina Andreyeva was a pseudonym used by a high-standing official. It was consistently referred to posthumously as "an anti-perestroika manifesto". The publication of the article had been chosen carefully by conservative forces within the Central Committee apparatus and Valentin Chikin, the editor-in-chief of Sovetskaya Rossiya, and it was published on 13 March to coincide with Gorbachev's visit to Yugoslavia and Yavkovlev's visit to Mongolia on 14 March. With both of the leading reformers gone, the conservative Ligachev was in charge of the Central Committee apparatus. Ligachev endorsed the article, stating it was "a benchmark for what we need in our ideology today." In the words of historian Archie Brown "Old habits of prudence rapidly reasserted themselves in the face of an apparent signal of change in the balance of forces at the top of the party hierarchy and of a return to a time when dissenting intellectuals would no longer be treated with tolerance." Upon his return on 18 March, Gorbachev discussed it with the Politburo.  To his surprise several of his colleagues supported the content of the article, among them Vorotnikov, Gromyko, Ligachev, Solomentsev and Viktor Nikonov. The article was discussed in the 24–26 March Politburo meeting, in which the aforementioned conservatives alongside Viktor Chebrikov, the Chairman of the KGB, and Anatoly Lukyanov, a close associate of Gorbachev and the Head of the General Department, supported the article. Chebrikov condemned the criticisms of the Soviet system which had appeared with Gorbachev's reforms, and lamented the scheming "of our ideological adversary". Despite forming a majority, the conservatives did not opt for removing Gorbachev, largely because the institution of General Secretary still meant something in Soviet politics. Gorbachev insisted that every Politburo member had to openly state their position on the matter; Yakovlev, Ryzhkov, Medvedev and Eduard Shevardnadze condemned the article. In light of the pro-reformist stance of this mentioned, and Gorbachev himself, they managed to push the conservatives on the defensive, and got their approval to publish a formal reply to the article.

In light of this event, Gorbachev would seek to consolidate his power within the apparatus even further, especially in the Secretariat (which oversaw the work of the Central Committee apparatus). In his first years as General Secretary, Gorbachev had never chaired a meeting of the Secretariat, leaving that responsibility to the conservative. But in light of the strong backing the Andreyeva article had in the Central Committee apparatus, Gorbachev chaired the first Secretariat meetings in the affair's aftermath.

Plenums
The Central Committee was not a permanent institution. It convened plenary sessions. 21 CC plenary sessions were held between the 27th Congress and the 28th Congress. When the CC was not in session, decision-making power was vested in the internal bodies of the CC itself; that is, the Politburo and the Secretariat. None of these bodies were permanent either; typically they convened several times a month.

Apparatus
Individuals employed by Central Committee's bureaus, departments and newspapers made up the apparatus between the 27th Congress and the 28th Congress. The bureaus and departments were supervised by the Secretariat, and each secretary (member of the Secretariat) supervised a specific department. The leaders of departments were officially referred to as Heads, while the titles of bureau leaders varied between chairman, first secretary and secretary.

Traditional structure (1986–88)

Reorganisation (1988–90)

Composition

Members

Candidates

References

Citations

Bibliography

Central Committee of the Communist Party of the Soviet Union
1986 establishments in the Soviet Union
1990 disestablishments in the Soviet Union